HMS Vigo was a  of the Royal Navy. She was named after the Battle of Vigo, which took place in 1702 during the War of Spanish Succession between a British-Dutch Fleet and the French, and which ended in a victory for the British. Vigo was built by Fairfield Shipbuilding and Engineering Company of Govan. She was launched on 27 September 1945 and commissioned on 9 December 1946.

Service history
Upon commissioning, Vigo was placed in Reserve along with a number of her sister-ships. In 1949, Vigo joined the 3rd Destroyer Flotilla, based in the Mediterranean, which at that time, had quite a large Royal Navy presence. She performed a variety of operations there, at a time when there was much going on in the region and nearby, such as the internal turmoil in Egypt between 1951–1954.

In 1953, while still in the Mediterranean, Vigo suffered a fire onboard her, causing minor damage, though Vigo would suffer another fire in 1954. Also that year, Vigo became the Gunnery Training Ship based at Portsmouth, a duty that a number of her sister ships also performed.

In addition to being the Gunnery Training Ship to HMS Excellent, at Whale Island, Vigo was also Captain (D) of the Portsmouth Squadron.

As well as her Gunnery duties, during the period 1958–59, Vigo also carried out two Icelandic patrols during the first Cod War; took part in NATO exercises, and visited such ports as Vigo, Cuxhaven, Caen and Den Helder, before being paid off in September, 1959, having been relieved as Captain (D) by  around 17 August 1959. By this date her hull was considered to be beyond economic repair. Her last commanding officer, Captain M P Pollock MVO DSC, went on to become Admiral of the Fleet.

Disposal
Following decommissioning in 1959, she was finally scrapped in 1964 at Faslane.

Notes

References
 
 
 

 

Battle-class destroyers of the Royal Navy
Ships built in Govan
1945 ships
Cold War destroyers of the United Kingdom